The 2001–02 Austrian Cup was the 68th season of Austria's nationwide football cup competition. It commenced with the matches of the First Round in August 2001 and concluded with the Final on 12 May 2002. The competition was won by Grazer AK after beating SK Sturm Graz 3–2 and hence qualifying for the 2002–03 UEFA Cup.

First round

| colspan="3" style="background:#fcc;"|

|}

Second round

| colspan="3" style="background:#fcc;"|

|-
| colspan="3" style="background:#fcc;"|

|-
| colspan="3" style="background:#fcc;"|

|-
| colspan="3" style="background:#fcc;"|

|}

Third round

| colspan="3" style="background:#fcc;"|

|-
| colspan="3" style="background:#fcc;"|

|-
| colspan="3" style="background:#fcc;"|

|}

Quarter-finals

| colspan="3" style="background:#fcc;"|

|-
| colspan="3" style="background:#fcc;"|

|}

Semi-finals

| colspan="3" style="background:#fcc;"|

|-
| colspan="3" style="background:#fcc;"|

|}

Final

Details

References

External links
 Austrian Cup 2001-2002
 RSSSF page

Austrian Cup seasons
2001–02 in Austrian football
Austrian Cup, 2001-02